Giovanni da Cascia, also Jovannes de Cascia, Johannes de Florentia, Maestro Giovanni da Firenze, was an Italian composer of the medieval era, active in the middle of the fourteenth century.

Life and career
Virtually nothing is known about Giovanni's life. From his surname it is presumed that he was born in the village of Cascia, near Florence. It was once thought that he held a post at Florence Cathedral, but this is no longer accepted. A Florentine chronicle states that Giovanni and Jacopo da Bologna competed at Mastino II of Scala's court; Mastino died in 1351. The metaphors used in his works are consistent with prevailing idioms of the mid-14th century. His portrait in the Squarcialupi Codex shows him without priestly garments.

Music
Nineteen of Giovanni's compositions survive, scattered in nine manuscripts. Sixteen of these are madrigals, and three of them are cacce. He is thought to have written some of his own texts. Musically, Giovanni's madrigals are of importance in the development of the style of the 14th-century madrigal. He tends to use extended melismas on the first and penultimate syllables of a poetic line, and sometimes introduces hockets at these points. The middles of the lines are generally syllabic. Many of his works are very similar in style to the anonymous works preserved in the Rossi Codex.

Several of his works survive in quite different versions; this is evidence that improvisation was still an important aspect of musical performance up to this time. Giovanni's works tend not to be tonally unified; they begin and end on different notes, and in some cases, such as Nascoso el viso, each poetic line begins and ends on different notes. Occasional imitation is found in his work.

Works
Madrigals
(all for two voices)
Agnel son bianco
Appress’un fiume chiaro
Deh, come dolcemente
Donna già fu’
Fra mille corvi
In su la ripa
La bella stella
Nascoso el viso
Nel meço a sei paon
O perlaro gentil
O tu, cara sciença
Per ridda andando ratto
Più non mi curo
Quando la stella
Sedendo all’ombra
Togliendo l’una a l’altra

Cacce
(all for three voices)
Con brachi assai
Nel bosco sença foglie
Per larghi prati

Doubtful
De soto ’l verde (2 voices)

Lost
Soni multi et ballate (1 voice)

Editions
Editions of all of Giovanni's works have been completed by W. Thomas Marrocco and Nino Pirrotta in the twentieth century.

References
Fischer/D'Agostino, "Giovanni da Cascia". The New Grove Dictionary of Music and Musicians online.

Italian male classical composers
Trecento composers
Medieval male composers